The 1960 NCAA University Division football season marked the last time that the University of Minnesota was a national champion on the gridiron. Murray Warmath's Minnesota Gophers were not in the Top 20 in preseason polling, but received the AP trophy at the end of the regular season before losing to Washington in the Rose Bowl. The Mississippi Rebels received the FWAA trophy after the bowl games.

During the 20th century, the NCAA had no playoff for the major college football teams in the University Division, later known as Division I-A.  The NCAA did recognize a national champion based upon the final results of "wire service" (AP and UPI) polls. The extent of that recognition came in the form of acknowledgment in the annual NCAA Football Guide of the "unofficial" national champions. The AP poll in 1960 consisted of the votes of 48 sportswriters; the year before, more than 200 voters had split first place votes between Syracuse, Mississippi, LSU, Texas, Georgia, Wisconsin and Alabama. The Associated Press relied thereafter on a "special panel representing all sections of the country". Though not all the panelists voted in every poll, each would give their opinion of the twenty best teams.  Under a point system of 20 points for first place, 19 for second, etc., the "overall" ranking was determined. Although the rankings were based on the collective opinion of the representative sportswriters, the teams that remained "unbeaten and untied" were generally ranked higher than those that had not. A defeat, even against a strong opponent, tended to cause a team to drop in the rankings, and a team with two or more defeats was unlikely to remain in the Top 20.

The top teams played in the four major postseason bowl games: the Rose (near Los Angeles at Pasadena), Sugar (New Orleans), Orange (Miami) and Cotton (Dallas). These bowls were contested on January 2, as New Year's Day fell on a Sunday.

Conference and program changes

Conference changes
One conference changed its name prior to the 1960 season:
After the Big Seven Conference, still officially known as the Missouri Valley Intercollegiate Athletic Association, added Oklahoma State, the conference's unofficial name became the Big Eight Conference. This name would remain until the league's dissolution in 1995.

Membership changes

September
In the preseason poll released on September 12, the defending champion Syracuse Orangemen and 1959's second-place finisher, the Mississippi Rebels, were No. 1 and No. 2, with 26 and 21 first place votes respectively. They were followed by the No. 3 Washington Huskies from Seattle, the No. 4 Texas Longhorns and the No. 5 Illinois Fighting Illini.  As the regular season progressed, a new poll would be issued on the Monday following the weekend's games.

The Big Ten schools would not kick off until September 24. On September 17, No. 2 Mississippi beat the Houston Cougars in Houston, 42–0. No. 3 Washington crushed the visiting College of the Pacific, 55–6 (the school became the University of the Pacific in 1961). No. 4 Texas opened its season with a loss at home to Nebraska, falling 14–13. Ole Miss was voted No. 1, followed by No. 2 Syracuse, No. 3 Washington, and No. 4 Illinois. Previously unranked Alabama, which had beaten No. 13 Georgia 21–6 in Birmingham, was fifth.

September 24 No. 1 Mississippi beat Kentucky in Memphis, 21–6. No. 2 Syracuse opened its season with a 55–7 win over Boston University. No. 3 Washington won at home again, beating the University of Idaho Vandals 41–12. No. 4 Illinois beat Indiana 17–6. In Lincoln, Minnesota beat No. 12 Nebraska 26–14. No. 5 Alabama was tied 6–6 by Tulane in New Orleans. Mississippi, Syracuse, Washington, and Illinois remained as the top four in the next poll, but Kansas, which had crushed Kansas State 41–0 on the road, rose from No. 7 to No. 5. Minnesota entered the poll at the No. 18 spot.

October
October 1 No. 1 Mississippi played its second straight game in Memphis, Tennessee, beating Memphis State 31–20. No. 2 Syracuse defeated No. 5 Kansas in Lawrence, Kansas, 14–7, to reclaim the top spot.  No. 3 Washington narrowly lost 15–14 at home to the No. 17 Navy Midshipmen. No. 4 Illinois beat West Virginia 33–0. No. 8 Iowa beat No. 6 Northwestern 42-0 on the road. No. 9 Ohio State shut out visiting USC 20-0. No. 18 Minnesota beat Indiana 42–0. The following poll featured No. 1 Syracuse and No. 2 Mississippi, followed by three Big Ten teams: No. 3 Iowa, No. 4 Illinois, and No. 5 Ohio State. Also from the Big Ten, Purdue was 7th, Michigan State 13th, and Minnesota 14th.

October 8 
No. 1 Syracuse struggled to beat Holy Cross 15–6 in Worcestor, Mass. No. 2 Mississippi won in their third consecutive trip to Tennessee, beating Vanderbilt 26–0 in Nashville. No. 3 Iowa beat No. 13 Michigan State in East Lansing, 27–15.  No. 4 Illinois lost in Champaign, Ill., to No. 5 Ohio State, 34–7. No. 6 Navy, which had beaten SMU 26–7 at a game in the naval port of Norfolk, Virginia, came in at fifth. No. 14 Minnesota beat Northwestern 7–0. The next poll was: No. 1 Mississippi, No. 2 Iowa, No. 3 Ohio State, No. 4 Syracuse, and No. 5 Navy. Minnesota reached the Top Ten at No. 10.

On October 15, No. 1 Mississippi beat Tulane in New Orleans 26–13, and No. 2 Iowa beat No. 12 Wisconsin at home, 28–21.  No. 3 Ohio State lost a close one at Purdue 24–21. No. 4 Syracuse beat No. 20 Penn State 21–15,  and  No. 5 Navy beat the Air Force Academy 35–3 in Baltimore. No. 6 Missouri reached 5–0 after a 45–0 win over Kansas State at Manhattan, KS. No. 10 Minnesota beat Illinois 21–10.  The Iowa Hawkeyes narrowly topped the next poll, with 23 first place votes to 22 for Ole Miss, and only two points to separate No. 1 and No. 2 (442–440).  They were followed by No. 3 Syracuse, No. 4 Navy, and No. 5 Missouri. Minnesota rose from 10th to 6th.

October 22 No. 1 Iowa beat No. 10 Purdue 21–14 and No. 2 Mississippi edged No. 14 Arkansas 10–7 in Little Rock. No. 3 Syracuse won at West Virginia 45–0, while No. 4 Navy beat the Ivy League's Pennsylvania in Philadelphia, 27–0.  No. 5 Missouri, which had held all of its opponents to single digits, continued winning with a 34–8 thrashing of Iowa State. In Ann Arbor, Michigan, No. 6 Minnesota beat Michigan 10–0.  Iowa tightened its hold on No. 1 in the next poll, with 34 of the 48 votes for first place. The next week's Top 20 had only nineteen teams, with Kansas at No. 19 with 2 points. The top five remained the same.

October 29 No. 1 Iowa beat No. 19 Kansas 21–7. No. 2 Mississippi played its 7th game of the season, but its first at home in Oxford, and was tied 6–6 by the LSU Tigers, the only team which had defeated them in 1959. No. 3 Syracuse lost to Pittsburgh 10–0. In Philadelphia, No. 4 Navy beat Notre Dame 14–7. No. 5 Missouri crushed Nebraska in Lincoln, 28–0, to go 7–0–0. At this time, they had outscored their opponents 210–31.  No. 6 Minnesota beat Kansas State 48–7. No. 8 Ohio State defeated No. 10 Michigan State in East Lansing, 21–10. The next poll again featured three Big Ten teams in the top five: No. 1 Iowa, No. 2 Missouri, No. 3 Minnesota, No. 4 Navy, and No. 5 Ohio State.

November
November 5  The battle between the Big Ten's two 6–0–0 teams took place in Minneapolis, where No. 1 Iowa lost to No. 3 Minnesota, 27–10. No. 2 Missouri beat No. 18 Colorado at home 16–6. No. 4 Navy lost in Durham, North Carolina, to No. 13 Duke 19–10. No. 5 Ohio State handled Indiana 36–7. Having dethroned the No. 1 team, the Minnesota Gophers took the top spot in the poll released on November 7, 1960, with 40 of the 47 voters voting them as No. 1. No. 6 Mississippi, still unbeaten, returned to the Top Five after a 45–0 win over the University of Chattanooga. The top five was No. 1 Minnesota, No. 2 Missouri, No. 3 Ohio State, No. 4 Mississippi, and No. 5 Iowa.

November 12 
No. 1 Minnesota lost to Purdue, 23–14. No. 2 Missouri gave up more than a touchdown for the first time, but still won 41–19 at Oklahoma. No. 3 Ohio State lost at No. 5 Iowa, 35–12. No. 4 Mississippi beat No. 14 Tennessee in Knoxville, 24–3.  No. 6 Washington, which had beaten California 27–7, moved into the Top Five. The Missouri Tigers captured the top spot in the next poll, which was No. 1 Missouri, No. 2 Iowa, No. 3 Mississippi, No. 4 Minnesota, and No. 5 Washington.

November 19 
Unbeaten No. 1 Missouri, with only a home game left between it and the national championship, lost to visiting Kansas, 23–7, but the game was later forfeited to Missouri due to the Jayhawks' use of an ineligible player. No. 2 Iowa defeated Notre Dame in South Bend, 28–0. No. 3 Mississippi was idle. No. 4 Minnesota closed its season with a 26–7 win at Wisconsin. They tied with Iowa atop the Big Ten standings and earned a Rose Bowl berth by virtue of their head-to-head victory over the Hawkeyes. Their opponent would be No. 5 Washington, which played its season ender against 4–4–1 Washington State in Spokane and won only by a 2–point conversion, 8–7. In the penultimate poll, released November 21, No. 1 Minnesota, No. 2 Iowa, and No. 3 Mississippi had 13½, 17½ and 13 first place votes respectively (voters were allowed to split their choices for No. 1), followed by No. 4 Washington and No. 5 Missouri.

November 26 
No. 3 Mississippi finished its season unbeaten (9–0–1) with a 35–9 win at home over Mississippi State, earning the SEC title and a spot in the Sugar Bowl. All of the other Top Five teams had finished their schedules, but No. 7 Navy moved up in the final poll with a 17–12 victory against Army. The Midshipmen would face off against Missouri in the Orange Bowl.

With both the AP and UPI finishing their voting before the bowl games, the championship was determined in December. The AP writers divided among No. 1 Minnesota (8–1), No. 2 Mississippi (9–0–1), and No. 3 Iowa (8–1), and some voters split their choices. As such, the Minnesota Gophers received 17½ votes for No. 1, Mississippi got 16, and Iowa 12½. Minnesota had 433½ poll points, ahead of 411 for Ole Miss and 407½ for Iowa. The next tier of teams all had one loss and also were closely packed together: No. 4 Navy had 262 poll points, No. 5 Missouri had 253, and No. 6 Washington had 250. The UPI Coaches Poll placed the teams in a slightly different order, but also settled on Minnesota as the No. 1 choice.

Because the final Associated Press and United Press International polls were conducted after the final game of the regular season, Minnesota is considered the national champion for 1960 despite their loss to Washington in the Rose Bowl. After the bowl games, the Helms Athletic Foundation recognized Washington as national champion, while the Football Writers Association of America crowned Mississippi as national champion.  Had the polls been taken after the bowl games, Missouri would likely also have been a contender for the national championship, as the Tigers beat Navy in the Orange Bowl and their 10–1 record was improved to 11–0 when the Kansas game was declared a forfeit.

The MAC's Ohio Bobcats were also crowned the world small college football champions in 1960, after an undefeated season.

December
December 8
The Big Eight faculty committee, meeting in Kansas City, ruled Kansas halfback Bert Coan ineligible and ordered the Jayhawks to forfeit their last two victories on November 12 and 19. The reversal brought Missouri's record to 11–0 instead of 10–1.

Conference standings

Bowl games
Because the final polls came out in November, the outcome of the post-season bowl games had no effect on the championships already awarded by the AP and UPI polls. As winner of the Big Ten title, No. 1 Minnesota went to the Rose Bowl to face Washington, which had the best record of the five teams in the AAWU (today's Pac-12). No. 2 Mississippi, as winner of the SEC, was invited to the Sugar Bowl to face unranked Rice University. The Big Ten did not allow its teams to play in a postseason game other than the Rose Bowl, so No. 3 Iowa stayed home. Although Washington upset Minnesota 17–7 in Pasadena, the post-season loss did not affect the Gophers' championship as determined by the AP and UPI.

Major bowls
Monday, January 2, 1961

Other bowls

Heisman Trophy voting
The Heisman Trophy is given to the year's most outstanding player

Source:

See also
 1960 NCAA University Division football rankings
 1960 College Football All-America Team

References